The 1922 Ludlow by-election was held on 4 January 1922.  The by-election was held due to the death of the incumbent Coalition Conservative MP, Beville Stanier.  It was won by the Coalition Conservative candidate, Ivor Windsor-Clive.

Result

References

1922 elections in the United Kingdom
1922 in England
20th century in Shropshire
Ludlow
By-elections to the Parliament of the United Kingdom in Shropshire constituencies
Unopposed by-elections to the Parliament of the United Kingdom (need citation)